Eléctrico Futebol Clube is a futsal team based in the city of Ponte de Sor, Portugal, that plays in the Portuguese Futsal First Division. It is a part of the Eléctrico F.C. sports club. In 2018 Eléctrico F.C. won the South Zone series of the Portuguese II Divisão Futsal achieving the promotion to the first tier Liga Sport Zone for the first time in its history.

Current squad

References

External links
 Official Facebook
 Zerozero

Futsal clubs in Portugal